Okehampton College is a co-educational secondary school and sixth form located in Okehampton in the English county of Devon.

History
Previously a foundation school administered by Devon County Council, in January 2018 Okehampton College converted to academy status and is now sponsored by the Dartmoor Multi-Academy Trust.

Admissions
Pupils are normally admitted from Boasley Cross Community Primary School, Bridestowe Primary School, Chagford CE Primary School, Exbourne CE Primary School, Hatherleigh Community Primary School, Lew Trenchard CE Primary School, Lydford School, Northlew & Ashbury Parochial Primary School, North Tawton Community Primary School,  Okehampton Primary School and South Tawton Primary School. The school also operates a federation with Holsworthy Community College in Holsworthy.

Academics
Okehampton College offers GCSEs, BTECs and OCR Nationals as programmes of study for pupils, while students in the sixth form have the option to study from a range of A Levels, NVQs and further BTECs.

Notable awards
Zayed Future Energy Prize - 2013 winner 
'Outstanding' OFSTED report - 2014

Notable former pupils
Georgina Geikie, sport shooter
Steve Holliday, businessman

References

External links
Okehampton College official website

Secondary schools in Devon
Academies in Devon
Okehampton